Zonosaurus ornatus, the ornate girdled lizard, is a species of lizard in the family Gerrhosauridae. The species is endemic to Madagascar.

References

Zonosaurus
Reptiles of Madagascar
Endemic fauna of Madagascar
Reptiles described in 1831
Taxa named by John Edward Gray